The Convention on Damage Caused by Foreign Aircraft to Third Parties on the Surface, commonly called the Rome Convention, is an international treaty, concluded at Rome on October 7, 1952. It entered into force on February 4, 1958, and as of 2018 has been ratified by 51 states. Canada, Australia, and Nigeria were previous state parties but have denounced (withdrawn from) the treaty.

References

1952 in aviation
1952 in Italy
International Civil Aviation Organization treaties
Treaties concluded in 1952
Treaties entered into force in 1958
Treaties of Algeria
Treaties of Angola
Treaties of Argentina
Treaties of Azerbaijan
Treaties of Bahrain
Treaties of Belgium
Treaties of Benin
Treaties of Bolivia
Treaties of the Second Brazilian Republic
Treaties of Cameroon
Treaties of Cuba
Treaties of Ecuador
Treaties of the Republic of Egypt (1953–1958)
Treaties of El Salvador
Treaties of Gabon
Treaties of the Gambia
Treaties of Ghana
Treaties of Guatemala
Treaties of Guinea
Treaties of Haiti
Treaties of Honduras
Treaties of Ba'athist Iraq
Treaties of Italy
Treaties of Kenya
Treaties of Kuwait
Treaties of Lebanon
Treaties of Luxembourg
Treaties of Madagascar
Treaties of the Maldives
Treaties of Mali
Treaties of Mauritania
Treaties of Morocco
Treaties of Niger
Treaties of Oman
Treaties of Pakistan
Treaties of Papua New Guinea
Treaties of Paraguay
Treaties of Moldova
Treaties of the Soviet Union
Treaties of Rwanda
Treaties of Seychelles
Treaties of Francoist Spain
Treaties of the Dominion of Ceylon
Treaties of Suriname
Treaties of Togo
Treaties of Tunisia
Treaties of Uganda
Treaties of the United Arab Emirates
Treaties of Uruguay
Treaties of Vanuatu
Treaties of South Yemen